Eleutherodactylus grahami is a species of frog in the family Eleutherodactylidae. It is endemic to Artibonite, Haiti, the northwestern region of the country. Its common name is Graham's robber frog.

Eleutherodactylus grahami occurs on limestone ridges with boulders and xerophytic vegetation at elevations of  asl. It is moderately common in suitable habitat, but threatened by extreme habitat loss caused by charcoaling and small-scale agriculture; only pockets of suitable habitat remain.

References

grahami
Frogs of Haiti
Endemic fauna of Haiti
Amphibians described in 1979
Taxonomy articles created by Polbot